2022 Summer Gymnasiade is the 19th edition of the Gymnasiade. It was held from 14–22 May 2022 in Normandy, France.

Sports 
 Athletics
 Gymnastics
 Artistic gymnastics
 Rhythmic gymnastics
 Aerobic gymnastics
 Swimming
 Archery
 Fencing
 Judo
 Karate
 Taekwondo
 Wrestling
 Chess
 Tennis
 Golf
 Petanque
 Boxing
 Surfing
 Cycling

Participating nations 
Athletes from Belarus and Russia are banned from participating in the games due to the Russian invasion of Ukraine.

Medal table 
The medal table is based on the official website of the 2022 Summer Gymnasiade organizing committee

References 

 ISF World Gymnasiade and European School Sport Games
 British Medallists in ISF World Gymnasiade and European School Sport Games
 The History of the Gymnasiade | NEWS | World Athletics

Gymnasiade